Marseille International Film Festival  (in French the Festival international de cinéma de Marseille or FIDMarseille) is a documentary film festival held yearly since 1989 in Marseille, France. The festival awards grand prizes in international and national categories. The 2009 competition featured 20 documentaries in the international category and 14 in the French category.

Past winners of the grand prize of the international competition include Chantal Akerman's Là-bas (co-winner 2006), Eduardo Coutinho's O Fim e o Princípio (co-winner 2006), Simone Bitton's Wall (2004) Tie Xi Qu: West of the Tracks (2003), In Public (2002), Patricio Guzmán's Le Cas Pinochet (2001).

Marseille International Film Festival is part of the Doc Alliance—a creative partnership between 7 key European documentary film festivals.

References

External links
 Official site

Documentary film festivals in France
Culture of Marseille
Tourist attractions in Marseille